Niram Marunna Nimishangal is a 1982 Indian Malayalam film, directed by Mohan. The film stars Jayabharathi and Sukumaran in the lead roles. The film has musical score by Shyam.

Cast
Jayabharathi
Sukumaran

Soundtrack
The music was composed by Shyam and the lyrics were written by Bichu Thirumala.

References

External links
 

1982 films
1980s Malayalam-language films